Qais Al-Sindy (born 1967) is an Iraqi contemporary artist and painter currently residing in California.

Education and work
Qais received B.Sc., from college of Engineering, Baghdad University in 1989. Thereafter, he started to study Art. In 2000, he received BA, Academy of Fine Arts, in Baghdad University in which he got his MFA (Master in Fine Art) in 2004.

Qais left Iraq in 2004 for the reason according to him were the restrictions on his work. He lived temporarily in Jordan, before settling down in USA in 2008.  

His paintings are based on themes of exile and fundamental humanity.

His paintings (16x20x20), twenty paintings, all 16 x 20 each, were displayed in The Jerusalem Fund Gallery Al-Quds Washington-DC, USA in 2018.

Qais has also produced an 11-minute documentary about the burning of the Iraqi library called “Letters Don’t Burn.”

Select list of work

Solo 
 2018 September, Solo Exhibition (16x20x20), The Jerusalem Fund Gallery Al-Quds. Washington-DC, USA.
 2018 March 1, Solo Exhibition (Let’s Begin…Again), Alexander Salazar-Fine Art Gallery, San Diego, California, USA.
 2016 February 12, Solo Exhibition (LOVERS), Alexander Salazar-Fine Art Gallery, San Diego, California, USA.
 2015 November 5, Solo Exhibition (You…&I), E C Gallery, Beverly Hills, Los Angeles, California, USA.

Group 
 2018 March 15–18. The Other Art Fair- Los Angeles, supported by Saatchi Art.
 2017 Oct. 28th- Nov. 2nd, Annual Group Exhibition of the Iraqi Fine Artists Association in Britain (IFAA) London- UK.
 2017 Dec., Iraqi Collective Exhibition- Sultan Bin Ali Al Owais Foundation. Dubai-UAE.
2014 October 16, Two Artist Exhibit (Encoded Histories) with Doris Bittar, San Diego Mesa College, San Diego- CA, USA

See also
 Iraqi art
 Islamic art
 List of Iraqi artists

References

External links
 official website

1967 births
Living people
Artists from Baghdad
Iraqi contemporary artists
Iraqi painters
20th-century male artists